The  is a  Japanese trade organization for the electronics and IT industries. It was formed in 2000 from two earlier organizations, the Electronic Industries Association of Japan and the Japan Electronic Industries Development Association.

History
In 1979, Minato Communications Association Co., Ltd. has first appeared in Minato, Tokyo, Japan. In 2000, Minato Communications Association Co., Ltd. was Re-branded into Japan Electronics and Information Technology Industries Association.

See also
 JIS semiconductor designation
 Design rule for Camera File system
 ISDB
 EIAJ DC coaxial power connector standards

External links
 JEITA

Electronics industry in Japan
Trade associations based in Japan
Standards organizations in Japan
Organizations established in 1979
1979 establishments in Japan